Alexander Leonidovich von Fessing (17 January 1877 - 12 November 1941) was a Yelisavetgrad-born Russian and Ukrainian, Soviet actor and theatre director, better known under his stage name Zagarov (Загаров).

A Moscow Philharmonic Drama School graduate (where he studied under Vladimir Nemirovich-Danchenko), Zagarov joined the Moscow Art Theatre (where his father was an administrator) in 1898 and stayed with it (with breaks) until 1906. His best-known roles here included Kleshch (The Lower Depths), Sorin (The Seagull), Publius and Pindarus (Julius Caesar). All the while he worked in the Yaroslavl theatre (where he debuted as a director in 1901), was actively involved with Meyerhold's New Drama and (since 1901) read drama at the Philharmonic Drama School.

In 1909-1910 he headed the Korsh Theatre; then moved to Alexandrinka to act and direct (1910-1916). After 1917 Zagarov worked for ten years in Ukraine. From 1921 to 1927 while in exile, he directed at the Ukrainian Discourse Theatre and Uzhgorod Theater "Prosvita". He taught at the Lviv Drama School, and published letters to defend the Ukrainian language in Western Ukraine. In 1924 he played the role of a Ukrainian peasant in the German film "Golden Wolf".  He headed the city theatres in Kiev and Kharkiv, and co-founded the Donetsk Music and Drama Theatre. Later he worked in Penza, Vladivostok, Khabarovsk, Kovrov and Saratov. In 1940 Zagarov was honoured with the title Meritorious Practitioner of Arts of RSFSR. "The master of high culture, tireless experimenter and a proponent of the Stanislavski and Nemirovich-Danchenko's ideas," was how the Theatre Encyclopedia described him.

Notes

References 

Russian male stage actors
Ukrainian male stage actors
Moscow Art Theatre
1877 births
1941 deaths
People from Kropyvnytskyi
People from Kherson Governorate
Ukrainian Discourse Theatre
Male actors from the Russian Empire